I Am Not an Easy Man is a 2018 French romantic comedy directed by Éléonore Pourriat. The film stars Vincent Elbaz as a chauvinist who ends up in a parallel universe where stereotypical gender roles are reversed. The film was released worldwide on April 13, 2018, by Netflix. It is the second French-language Netflix original film (after Blockbuster) and the first French-language film commissioned by Netflix.

Synopsis
Damien is a shameless chauvinist who has all the benefits of living in a patriarchal society. After a bump to the head, Damien passes out. When he wakes up, he finds himself in what seems to be an alternate universe where gender roles are reversed and women have the power. Damien feels confused: now that he experiences sexism he struggles to find his place in this foreign new world. He meets and seduces Alexandra, an influential novelist who is herself a chauvinist.

Cast
 Vincent Elbaz as Damien
 Marie-Sophie Ferdane as Alexandra
 Pierre Bénézit as Christophe
 Blanche Gardin as Sybille
 Céline Menville as Lolo
 Christele Tual as Annie
 Moon Dailly as Alexandra's coach
 Camille Landru-Girardet as Ludovic

Production
The film finds its origins in Oppressed Majority, a 2010 short film directed by Pourriat, about a stay-at-home dad who experiences sexism in a parallel, female-dominated world, and eventually becomes the victim of sexual assault. In 2014, after being released on video-sharing platform YouTube with English-language subtitles, the short garnered international attention and Pourriat was approached by Netflix to develop a new, larger project based on the initial premise. Pourriat initially wanted to make a series, but she eventually reached an agreement with Netflix to produce a feature-length romantic comedy with the help of producers Eleonore Dailly and Edouard de Lachomette.

The film premiered on Netflix on April 13, 2018. In accordance with French laws on digital film distribution, the film was not scheduled for theatrical release in France, in order to be immediately available online. Pierre Bénézit, the lead actor in Oppressed Majority, played the supporting character Christophe in I Am Not an Easy Man.

Reception 
Étienne Sorin, in Le Figaro, deplores an “uneven comedy” and conventional. For her part, Arièle Bonte, on RTL, advises the vision of the film for, in particular, the disturbing subject likely to change mentalities and the “amazing” quality of the interpretation of Marie-Sophie Ferdane.

References

External links
  on Netflix
 
 

2010s feminist films
2018 films
French comedy films
French feminist films
French-language Netflix original films
Gender role reversal
2010s French films
2010s French-language films